Jason Lee Von Flue (born August 1, 1975) is a former American mixed martial artist who appeared on the second season of The Ultimate Fighter. A professional competitor since 1999, he has competed for the UFC, WEC, Strikeforce and King of the Cage.

In 2006, at UFC Ultimate Fight Night 3 against Alex Karalexis, Von Flue successfully applied a unique submission move to counter the guillotine choke that is now commonly referred to as the Von Flue choke.  Additionally, since 2017, the "Von Flue choke" has occasionally been referred to as the "Von Preux Choke", due to its usage by Ovince Saint Preux.

Mixed martial arts career

Early career
Von Flue made his professional MMA debut in June 1999, fighting and winning three times in one night on the International Fighting Championships WC 3: Warriors Challenge 3 show. Over the next six years, he amassed a record of 10 wins, 4 losses and 1 draw while fighting for promotions such as King of the Cage and World Extreme Cagefighting in his native California.

The Ultimate Fighter 2
On episode three of The Ultimate Fighter 2, fighter Josh Burkman was asked to leave due to a broken arm and Von Flue came to the team of Matt Hughes as a replacement fighter. Considered the underdog, he went on to get an upset win in his first fight against Jorge Gurgel. Despite his performance, he was given to team Franklin when Hughes was forced to give up one of his members to the other team. He faced former teammate Joe Stevenson in the semifinals, losing due to an armbar submission. After his performance on the show, he was signed to a UFC contract.

Ultimate Fighting Championship
In his first match since the show, Von Flue fought at Ultimate Fight Night 3 where he defeated season one The Ultimate Fighter contestant Alex Karalexis via technical submission, as Karalexis was rendered unconscious by a shoulder choke from side control. This technique is now commonly known as a Von Flue Choke. Though this unique choke submission was around before Von Flue, he was perhaps the first person to get a technical submission on a large stage.

In his second UFC match at Ultimate Fight Night 4, he was defeated by fellow TUF 2 contestant Luke Cummo via decision.

For his third fight in the UFC, Von Flue faced Joe Riggs at UFC Fight Night 6 on August 17, 2006. He lost the fight via triangle choke submission, and was subsequently released from the promotion.

Strikeforce
Two months after his UFC release, Von Flue signed with now-defunct promotion Strikeforce. He debuted for the promotion on October 4, 2006, facing Eric Wray at Strikeforce: Tank vs. Buentello. He won the fight via arm-triangle choke.

Von Flue then faced Cung Le at Strikeforce: Triple Threat on December 8, 2006. He lost the fight via doctor stoppage TKO, due to a cut that opened up on Von Flue. Von Flue faced Luke Stewart at Strikeforce Shamrock vs. Baroni and lost via TKO in the third round. He was subsequently released from the promotion following this loss.

Independent promotions
In his last fight in mixed martial arts, Von Flue faced Marcus Gaines at TWC: Trauma on July 23, 2009. He lost the fight via second round submission. Von Flue was scheduled to return from a near five-year retirement and face Conor Cooke at Cage Contender 18 on April 26, 2014, however the bout would be cancelled prior to the event for unknown reasons.

Mixed martial arts record 

|-
| Loss
| align=center| 14–12–1
| Marcus Gaines
| TKO (Submission to punches to the body)
| The Warriors Cage: Trauma
| 
| align=center| 2
| align=center| 0:58
| Porterville, California, United States
| 
|-
| Win
| align=center| 14–11–1
| Steve Ramerez
| Submission (rear-naked choke)
| PureCombat: Backyard Brawl
| 
| align=center| 1
| align=center| 2:54
| Tulare, California, United States
| 
|-
| Loss
| align=center| 13–11–1
| Kyle Pimentel
| TKO (kick to the body)
| CCFC: Rumble in the Park II
| 
| align=center| 2
| align=center| 0:29
| Fresno, California, United States
| 
|-
| Win
| align=center| 13–10–1
| Bryson Kamaka
| Submission (kneebar)
| PureCombat: Hard Core
| 
| align=center| 1
| align=center| 2:43
| Visalia, California, United States
| 
|-
| Loss
| align=center| 12–10–1
| Pete Spratt
| KO (punches)
| UWC: Invasion
| 
| align=center| 2
| align=center| 0:59
| Fairfax, Virginia, United States
| 
|-
| Loss
| align=center| 12–9–1
| Brett Cooper
| TKO (punches)
| PURECOMBAT: From the Ashes
| 
| align=center| 1
| align=center| N/A
| Visalia, California, United States
| 
|-
| Loss
| align=center| 12–8–1
| Luke Stewart
| TKO (punches)
| Strikeforce Shamrock vs. Baroni
| 
| align=center| 3
| align=center| 2:17
| San Jose, California, United States
| 
|-
| Loss
| align=center| 12–7–1
|  Cung Le
| TKO (doctor stoppage)
| Strikeforce: Triple Threat
| 
| align=center| 1
| align=center| 0:43
| San Jose, California, United States
| 
|-
| Win
| align=center| 12–6–1
| Eric Wray
| Submission (arm-triangle choke)
| Strikeforce: Tank vs. Buentello
| 
| align=center| 2
| align=center| 4:42
| Fresno, California, United States
| 
|-
| Loss
| align=center| 11–6–1
| Joe Riggs
| Submission (triangle choke)
| UFC Fight Night 6
| 
| align=center| 1
| align=center| 2:01
| Las Vegas, Nevada, United States
| 
|-
| Loss
| align=center| 11–5–1
| Luke Cummo
| Decision (unanimous)
| UFC Fight Night 4
| 
| align=center| 3
| align=center| 5:00
| Las Vegas, Nevada, United States
| 
|-
| Win
| align=center| 11–4–1
| Alex Karalexis
| Technical Submission (Von Flue choke)
| UFC Fight Night 3
| 
| align=center| 3
| align=center| 1:17
| Las Vegas, Nevada, United States
| 
|-
| Win
| align=center| 10–4–1
| Nick Davanzo
| Submission (choke)
| KOTC 49: Soboba
| 
| align=center| 1
| align=center| 0:51
| San Jacinto, California, United States
| 
|-
| Draw
| align=center| 9–4–1
| Mac Danzig
| Draw
| GC 25: Gladiator Challenge 25
| 
| align=center| 2
| align=center| 5:00
| Porterville, California, United States
| 
|-
| Win
| align=center| 9–4
| Chris Irvine
| Submission (arm-triangle choke)
| WEC 8
| 
| align=center| 1
| align=center| 2:04
| Lemoore, California, United States
| 
|-
| Win
| align=center| 8–4
| Nick Gilardi
| Technical Submission (Von Flue choke)
| WEC 7
| 
| align=center| 1
| align=center| 2:46
| Lemoore, California, United States
| 
|-
| Loss
| align=center| 7–4
| Bob Ostovich
| Submission (heel hook)
| Warriors Quest 2: Battle of Champions
| 
| align=center| 1
| align=center| N/A
| Hawaii, United States
| 
|-
| Loss
| align=center| 7–3
| Jim Walker
| KO (punch)
| IFC WC 12: Warriors Challenge 12
| 
| align=center| 1
| align=center| 1:34
| Friant, California, United States
| 
|-
| Loss
| align=center| 7–2
| Ronald Jhun
| TKO (punches)
| IFC WC 10: Warriors Challenge 10
| 
| align=center| 1
| align=center| N/A
| Friant, California, United States
| 
|-
| Win
| align=center| 7–1
| Eric Meaders
| Submission (ankle lock)
| CFF: The Cobra Classic 2000
| 
| align=center| 1
| align=center| 6:44
| Anza, California, United States
| 
|-
| Win
| align=center| 6–1
| Chris Ellerton
| Submission (rear-naked choke)
| IFC WC 8: Warriors Challenge 8
| 
| align=center| 1
| align=center| 6:01
| Friant, California, United States
| 
|-
| Win
| align=center| 5–1
| Mike Voltz
| Submission (neck crank)
| CFF: Cobra Open
| 
| align=center| 1
| align=center| 1:58
| Anza, California, United States
| 
|-
| Win
| align=center| 4–1
| Savant Young
| KO (punch)
| IFC WC 5: Warriors Challenge 5
| 
| align=center| N/A
| align=center| N/A
| Fresno, California, United States
| 
|-
| Loss
| align=center| 3–1
| Toby Imada
| Submission (armbar)
| IFC WC 4: Warriors Challenge 4
| 
| align=center| 2
| align=center| 5:08
| Jackson, California, United States
| 
|-
| Win
| align=center| 3–0
| Dave Marinoble
| Submission (triangle choke)
| IFC WC 3: Warriors Challenge 3
| 
| align=center| N/A
| align=center| N/A
| Jackson, California, United States
| 
|-
| Win
| align=center| 2–0
| David Velasquez
| Submission (choke)
| IFC WC 3: Warriors Challenge 3
| 
| align=center| N/A
| align=center| N/A
| Jackson, California, United States
| 
|-
| Win
| align=center| 1–0
| Danny Gryder
| Submission (leglock)
| IFC WC 3: Warriors Challenge 3
| 
| align=center| N/A
| align=center| N/A
| Jackson, California, United States
|

Mixed martial arts exhibition match record 

|-
| Loss
| align=center| 1-1
| Joe Stevenson
| Submission (armbar)
| The Ultimate Fighter 2
| 
| align=center| 1
| align=center| 4:46
| Las Vegas, Nevada, United States
| 
|-
| Win
| align=center| 1-0
| Jorge Gurgel
| Decision (unanimous)
| The Ultimate Fighter 2
| 
| align=center| 3
| align=center| 5:00
| Las Vegas, Nevada, United States
| advanced to TUF 2 semifinals

References

External links 
 
 Von Flue's UFC Profile
 
 Von Flue's OFFICIAL MySpace

Von Flue, Jason
Von Flue, Jason
Welterweight mixed martial artists
Middleweight mixed martial artists
Mixed martial artists utilizing Brazilian jiu-jitsu
Sportspeople from Clovis, California
1975 births
American practitioners of Brazilian jiu-jitsu
People from Fresno County, California
Ultimate Fighting Championship male fighters